Mutukula Airport  is an airport serving the town of Mutukula in the Rakai District of the Central Region of Uganda.

See also
Transport in Uganda
List of airports in Uganda
Civil Aviation Authority of Uganda

References

External links
OpenStreetMap - Mutukula
Uganda Civil Aviation Authority Homepage

Airports in Uganda
Rakai District
Central Region, Uganda